Valley Bend Wildlife Management Area is located on  southwest of Valley Bend in Randolph County, West Virginia.

References

External links
West Virginia DNR District 3 Wildlife Management Areas

Wildlife management areas of West Virginia
Protected areas of Randolph County, West Virginia
IUCN Category V